Noah Ryan Scott (born August 26, 2000) is a Canadian actor best known for his role as Jakey Thomson in Booky and the Secret Santa (2007) and Booky's Crush (2009).

Career 

Scotts' first role in a film was when at 6 years old he landed the role of 'Jakey Thomson' in Booky and the Secret Santa, a made for TV film based upon the novel series by Bernice Thurman Hunter. He returned to reprise his role as 'Jakey Thomson' a year later in Booky's Crush. In 2010 Scott was cast as 'Young Darryl' in the Canadian Feature Film Moon Point'.
Featured television work includes  Little Mosque on the Prairie (2007), Doodlebops Rockin' Road Show (2010), The Bridge (2010) and Rick Mercer Report (2006 - 2013).
Scotts' latest role is a lead in the new Canadian Web series Kid's Town'' where he plays the Mayors son 'Jamie Redshaw'.

Filmography

References

External links 

 

2000 births
Living people
Canadian male film actors
Canadian male child actors
21st-century Canadian male actors
Place of birth missing (living people)